Joseph Draper Sayers (September 23, 1841 – May 15, 1929) was the 22nd Governor of Texas from 1899 to 1903. During Sayers's term, the Galveston Hurricane of 1900 demolished that city.

Early years 
Joseph Sayers was born September 23, 1841 in Grenada, Mississippi to Dr. David Sayers and his wife Mary Thomas {Peete}.  His mother died in 1851, and soon after he moved to Texas with his father and younger brother, William. The family settled in Bastrop, where Sayers and his brother attended the Bastrop Military Institute.

When the Civil War broke out, Sayers joined the Confederate States Army's 5th Texas Regiment, a cavalry unit led by General Tom Green. He participated in the Battle of Valverde in New Mexico in February 1862, and was recommended for promotion for his bravery in capturing an artillery battery. Later that year he returned to Texas with his regiment before being sent to Louisiana, where he was wounded in the Battle of Fort Bisland in April 1863. His actions during that conflict led to his promotion to major, and he became Green's chief–of–staff. Sayers was wounded again in April 1864 at the Battle of Mansfield. After Green died at the Battle of Blair's Landing, Sayers became the assistant adjutant to General Richard Taylor.

After the war ended, Sayers returned to Texas.  He opened a school and simultaneously studied law.  He was admitted to the bar and then formed a partnership with G. "Wash" Jones.

He married Orline Walton, an amateur painter. The walls of their apartments at the Riggs were adorned with beautiful specimens of her work. She painted portraits of herself and her husband, and has also made copies of several of the celebrated pictures at the Corcoran Art Gallery, while her china painting was exquisite. Orline Walton was a native of Aberdeen, Mississippi. During her childhood, her father moved with his family to Bastrop, Texas. She was married to Hon. Joseph D. Sayers when he was Lieutenant-Governor of the State, and the first years of her married life were spent at Austin. She was a member of the Methodist church and interested in its benevolent and educational work.

Public service 
Sayers entered political service in 1873, when he became a state senator in the 13th Texas Legislature. In his term, he helped reverse most of the legislation that had been passed under the Radical Republicans.  After his term ended in 1875, Sayers spent three years as chairman of the Texas State Democratic Executive Committee. He presided over the state Democratic convention in both 1876 and 1878.  At the 1878 convention he was nominated to be lieutenant governor under Oran M. Roberts and later won the election. Sayers and Roberts differed on one key point; Sayers believed that public lands should be saved for homesteaders and schools, not sold cheaply to speculators, as Roberts advocated.

In 1884, Sayers was elected to U.S. Congress, where he served until 1898. That year, he ran for governor, winning the election and taking office in early 1899. During his term in office, labor unions were exempted from antitrust laws, and blacklists were outlawed. His term saw increased spending on education, prisons, and social service institutions and outlawed railroad rebates.  He also spearheaded legislation that authorized the creation of school districts.

Sayers's term was notable for the number of disasters that the state faced. The Brazos River flooded in 1899, and the following year the Galveston Hurricane of 1900 caused great devastation. Other parts of the state suffered from a severe drought, and boll weevils caused widespread cotton destruction. Millions of dollars in assistance came to the state, and Sayers administered the distribution of the funds "honestly and fairly."

Later years 
After leaving office in 1903, Sayers focused mainly on his law practice. He also took the time, however, to serve on the Board of Regents for the University of Texas System as well as on the Industrial Accident Board, the State Board of Legal Advisors, and the pardon board.

Sayers died May 15, 1929 and is buried in Bastrop.

Notes

References

External links 
 
 

	

1841 births
1929 deaths
Democratic Party governors of Texas
Lieutenant Governors of Texas
Democratic Party members of the United States House of Representatives from Texas
Democratic Party Texas state senators
People from Grenada, Mississippi